Tadeusz Hołuj (1916 in Kraków – 1985 in Kraków) was a Polish poet, writer, publicist and politician.

Biography 
Before World War II, he published poems, and co-edited a literary magazine. During World War II, he joined the Polish resistance (Union of Armed Struggle, ZWZ), was arrested by the Germans and imprisoned in the Auschwitz concentration camp, where he also joined the camp's resistance.

After the war, he joined the communist party. He was a deputy to Polish parliament (Sejm) from 1972 to 1980. From 1965 he was a secretary general of the International Auschwitz Committee. He also wrote novels about the early socialist movement in Poland and about his camp experiences.

1916 births
1985 deaths
Auschwitz concentration camp survivors
Polish publicists
Polish resistance members of World War II
Polish Workers' Party politicians
Members of the Polish Sejm 1972–1976
Writers from Kraków
Politicians from Kraków
20th-century Polish poets
20th-century Polish male writers
Recipients of the State Award Badge (Poland)
International Auschwitz Committee members